Parvez Sultan (born 18 July 2003) is an Indian cricketer. He made his Twenty20 debut on 14 January 2021, for Tripura in the 2020–21 Syed Mushtaq Ali Trophy. He made his List A debut on 24 February 2021, for Tripura in the 2020–21 Vijay Hazare Trophy.

References

External links
 

2003 births
Living people
Indian cricketers
Tripura cricketers
Place of birth missing (living people)